Mike Flynn (October 19, 1967 – June 23, 2016) was an American online journalist who was known as the original editor of the Big Government website at Breitbart News.

Early life
Born and raised in Quincy, Illinois, Flynn was a sixth-generation native of central Illinois. He graduated from Quincy High School in 1985 and graduated from University of Iowa in 1989. From 1989 until 1992, Flynn was the general manager of the Coca-Cola Bottling Company in Keokuk, Iowa.

Career

According to the Quincy Herald-Whig, Flynn self-described "as a strongly conservative libertarian," and he emphasized the U.S. national debt, reducing government regulations, and border security.

Flynn worked on the staff of the Illinois General Assembly from 1992 to 1997, and then for the American Legislative Exchange Council from 1997 to 2004. He was a lobbyist with the Reason Foundation. Flynn testified numerous times before the U.S. Congress and dozens of state legislatures. His research has been cited by publications such as The Wall Street Journal, The Washington Post, and The New York Times.

In 2015, Flynn ran for Congress during the Illinois's 18th congressional district special election to fill the remainder of the term of Republican Aaron Schock, who resigned on March 31, 2015. He was endorsed by conservative activists such as Ted Cruz, Mark Levin, Congressman Steve King, Congressman Louie Gohmert, Richard Viguerie, Stephen Moore, and Erick Erickson. State Senator Darin LaHood defeated Flynn in the Republican primary on July 7, 2015, with 69.5% of the vote to Flynn's 27.7%.

In 2016, Flynn served as a member of the leadership team in Illinois for Cruz's presidential campaign, and at the time of his death, was scheduled to be a delegate for Cruz at the 2016 Republican National Convention.

Personal life
Flynn was married to his wife, Holly Flynn Pitt-Young, and had four children. He died from a heart attack in Washington, D.C. on June 23, 2016, aged 48.

References

1967 births
2016 deaths
21st-century American journalists
21st-century American male writers
American libertarians
American political writers
Breitbart News people
Candidates in the 2015 United States elections
Online journalists
People from Quincy, Illinois
University of Iowa alumni
Journalists from Illinois
Illinois Republicans